Anthony Franchina (born 11 October 1977) is a former Australian rules footballer in the Australian Football League.

Debuting in 1997, Franchina became a regular first-team midfielder at the Carlton Football Club. He was originally from Newlands-Coburg.

In 2003 he found himself dropped from the team on a few occasions, and in 2004 the final straw came for him, when he was delisted without playing a game for the year.

In 2005, he played in the Victorian Football League for the North Ballarat Roosters. In 2006, he returned to the Northern Bullants, Carlton's , as a VFL-listed player, where he regularly played in the seniors.

Since 2007, Franchina has played suburban football. From 2007 until the middle of 2011, he played for the Heidelberg Football Club in the Northern Football League, winning their best and fairest in 2008, and winning three premierships with the club. At the end of June 2011, he made a mid-season switch to the Balwyn Football Club in the Eastern Football League. Then he played for Pascoe Vale in the Essendon District Football League in 2012; and for Mornington in the Mornington Peninsula Nepean Football League in 2013.

He had the most tackles for Carlton in 2002, 72.

References

External links
Anthony Franchina at the Carlton Football Club website

1977 births
Carlton Football Club players
Australian people of Italian descent
Living people
Preston Football Club (VFA) players
Calder Cannons players
Heidelberg Football Club players
North Ballarat Football Club players
Australian rules footballers from Victoria (Australia)